Tihad Athlétique Sport de Casablanca is a Moroccan football club based in Casablanca. Of the many clubs based in Casablanca, they are one of the most popular behind Wydad Casablanca, Raja Casablanca and RAC.

History
TAS de Casablanca won their first major title when they beat Hassania Agadir 2–1 in the final to win the 2019 Throne Cup. By doing so, they became one of only three teams that have won the Throne Cup title while not playing in the top flight (alongside fellow Casablanca teams CLAS Casablanca and Majd Al Madina).

As a result, TAS de Casablanca earned the right to participate in the 2020-21 CAF Confederation Cup for the first time, while playing in the Moroccan Botola Pro League 2. They made history when they played and won their first match ever in a continental competition. The first leg was played in Gambia versus Gamtel and the visitors won 1–0. The Moroccans reached the play-off round, eventually losing to Zambian side Nkana 2–3 on aggregate, thereby narrowly missing out on a spot in the group stage.

Honours
Moroccan Throne Cup
Champions (1): 2018–19

References

Football clubs in Morocco
Football clubs in Casablanca
1947 establishments in Morocco
Sports clubs in Morocco